Velilla Power Plant was a coal-fired power plant near the village of Velilla del Río Carrión in the province of Palencia, community of Castile and León, Spain. Velilla Power Plant had two generating units with a capacity of 148 MW and 350 MW. The first unit was put into operation in 1964, and the second in 1984.

In 2008, Velilla Power Plant was equipped with filters, so now more than 95% of the detrimental sulfur dioxide are filtered out from smoke. This facility is owned by Iberdrola; it was shut down on June 30, 2020.

See also 
Palencia mining basin

References 

Coal-fired power stations in Spain
Province of Palencia
Energy infrastructure completed in 1964
1964 establishments in Spain
2020 disestablishments in Spain